José Gildardo Guerrero Torres (born 8 May 1975) is a Mexican politician affiliated with the National Action Party. As of 2014 he served as Deputy of the  LX Legislature of the Mexican Congress representing Jalisco.

References

1975 births
Living people
Politicians from Jalisco
National Action Party (Mexico) politicians
21st-century Mexican politicians
Deputies of the LX Legislature of Mexico
Members of the Chamber of Deputies (Mexico) for Jalisco